Mahmudiye is a town and district of Eskişehir Province in the Central Anatolia region of Turkey. According to 2010 census, population of the district is 8,770 of which 4,707 live in the town of Mahmudiye.

History
From 1867 until 1922, Mahmudiye was part of Hüdavendigâr vilayet.

Notes

References

External links
 District governor's official website 
 Map of Mahmudiye district

Towns in Turkey
Populated places in Eskişehir Province
Districts of Eskişehir Province